The Yari Film Group (YFG) is an independent film company headed by producer Bob Yari. The company deals in financing, production, acquisition, sales and distribution of theatrical feature films.  

The Yari Film Group was formed in 2005 through the merger of Stratus Film Company, Bull’s Eye Entertainment, El Camino Pictures, Bob Yari Productions, and Syndicate Films International.  YFG is led by Bob Yari, who intended to create a film consortium that would minimize investment risk and maximize creative freedom for filmmakers by financing a large slate of diverse films. Within the first two years, the group had produced 16 films. The company's early production credits included Academy Award Winner Crash, led by Matt Dillon and Sandra Bullock; The Hoax, with Richard Gere; The Matador with Pierce Brosnan; The Painted Veil starring Edward Norton; A Love Song for Bobby Long with John Travolta; Dave Chappelle's Block Party; Prime with Meryl Streep; Thumbsucker with Keanu Reeves and Vince Vaughn and Nothing but the Truth starring Kate Beckinsale.

History 
Yari Film Group Releasing (YFGR), the distribution arm of YFG, was created in 2006. YFGR's first releases were Winter Passing, starring Will Ferrell and Ed Harris, and Find Me Guilty, starring Vin Diesel. That same year, YFGR distributed The Illusionist, starring Edward Norton, Paul Giamatti and Jessica Biel, which pulled in roughly $40 million at the U.S. box office, and demonstrated the success of the platform release model. YFGR adopted an early strategy of producing and acquiring independent films with major name talent attached, such as The Illusionist, Winter Passing, Haven (with Orlando Bloom and Bill Paxton), Shortcut to Happiness (starring Alec Baldwin, Anthony Hopkins and Jennifer Love Hewitt) and Even Money (with Forest Whitaker, Ray Liotta and Danny DeVito).

Yari Film Group's distribution platform filed for bankruptcy on December 12, 2008, due to various box office flops, tightening credit markets and the bankruptcy of payroll company Axium, which according to Yari swept millions of dollars from its payroll accounts, as a “perfect storm” that sunk the company financially. Yari's last few films would instead be released directly to DVD by Sony Pictures Home Entertainment, who had earlier released The Perfect Season on DVD. Since then, the company has remained mostly silent, though it has still been retained by Yari for some films he's contributed to such as Papa: Hemingway in Cuba and the upcoming Fireflies at El Mozote. Yari has licensed the rights to a majority of their films to Moonstone Entertainment, who has rereleased them on home video through MVD Entertainment Group and on streaming through FilmRise.

List of Yari Film Group Releasing films

2005
 Winter Passing

2006
 Even Money
 First Snow
 Gray Matters
 Find Me Guilty
 Haven
 The Illusionist
 Winter Passing
 The Painted Veil

2007
 The Final Season
 The Good Night
 Kickin' It Old Skool
 Resurrecting the Champ
 Shortcut to Happiness
 The Perfect Holiday
 Christmas in Wonderland

2008

 The Girl in the Park
 My Father's Will
 Assassination of a High School President
 Nothing But The Truth
 What Doesn't Kill You

2009
 The Accidental Husband
 Possession
 The Maiden Heist

2015
 Papa: Hemingway in Cuba

In Production 

 Fireflies at El Mozote

References

Mass media companies established in 2002
Film production companies of the United States
2002 establishments in California
American independent film studios